Wolfgang Maria Bauer (born 9 June 1963) is a German television actor, theatre director and author.

Selected filmography
 Father's Day (1996)
  (1997)
 666 – Traue keinem, mit dem du schläfst! (666: In Bed with the Devil, 2002)
 Siska (TV-Series) (from 2004-2008)
 Die Wand (2012)
 Welcome to Germany (2016)

Selected writing (German)
Der Schatten eines Fluges - Die Geschichte von Mathias Kneißl
Der Zikadenzüchter
In den Augen eines Fremden
Julie, Traum und Rausch (nach Motiven August Strindbergs ...)
Kirsche in Not!
Nanou
Späte Wut
Wir hätten gewinnen müssen

External links
 
 Agency unit|one 

1963 births
Living people
German male television actors
Male actors from Munich